XHPENS-FM is a radio station on 94.7 FM in Ensenada, Baja California, Mexico. It is owned by Multimedios Radio and carries its La Lupe variety hits format.

History
XHPENS was awarded in the IFT-4 radio auction of 2017 and came to air May 4, 2018, taking over the La Caliente grupera format from XHHC-FM 92.1. The original plan was to have the station carry the Classic format, but that changed prior to signing on.

The station switched formats with XHHC and became La Lupe on November 4, 2020.

References

2018 establishments in Mexico
Radio stations established in 2018
Radio stations in Baja California
Spanish-language radio stations
Multimedios Radio